Gergely János Harsányi (born 3 May 1981) is a Hungarian handballer, who retired from professional handball in 2018 and currently plays for Tatai AC in the Hungarian second division.

Career
Harsányi started his professional career at his hometown club Nyíregyházi KC, before moving to PLER KC. He spent a decade with the Pestszentlőrinc-based team and captured a Hungarian Cup bronze in 2007. In the 2007–2008 season, he played handball in the German Bundesliga, Frisch Auf Göppingen, and then returned to PLER KC after 1 season. He signed to Ferencvárosi TC in the summer of 2009, however, after financial difficulties with the club were revealed, Harsányi was transferred to Tatabánya-Carbonex KC in the winter break to ease the growing troubles at the club. He retired from professional handball in 2018.

His first major international tournament was the 2004 Summer Olympics, where the Hungarian team placed fourth. He participated on two European Championship (2006, 2012), four World Championships (2009, 2011, 2013, 2017) and two Olympics (2004 and 2012).

Achievements
Nemzeti Bajnokság I:
Bronze Medallist: 2010, 2015, 2016, 2017, 2018
Magyar Kupa:
Bronze Medallist: 2007

Individual awards
  Golden Cross of the Cross of Merit of the Republic of Hungary (2012)

References

External links
 
 
 
 
 

1981 births
Living people
People from Nyíregyháza
Hungarian male handball players
Olympic handball players of Hungary
Handball players at the 2004 Summer Olympics
Handball players at the 2012 Summer Olympics
Sportspeople from Szabolcs-Szatmár-Bereg County